Natalya Khrushcheleva (born 20 March 1973 in Tavda) is a retired Russian middle-distance runner who won a bronze medal in 800 metres at the 2003 World Championships in Athletics. She has also been a member of the Russian 4 × 400 metres relay team.

International competitions

Personal bests
400 metres - 51.49 seconds (2000)
800 metres - 1:56.59 min (2004)

See also
List of World Athletics Championships medalists (women)
List of European Athletics Championships medalists (women)
800 metres at the World Championships in Athletics

References

Sports Reference
Infosport profile

1973 births
Living people
People from Sverdlovsk Oblast
Sportspeople from Sverdlovsk Oblast
Russian female middle-distance runners
Russian female sprinters
Olympic female middle-distance runners
Olympic athletes of Russia
Athletes (track and field) at the 2004 Summer Olympics
Universiade gold medalists in athletics (track and field)
Universiade gold medalists for Russia
World Athletics Championships athletes for Russia
World Athletics Championships medalists
European Athletics Championships medalists
20th-century Russian women
21st-century Russian women